The Stick Up Kids is a 2008 film directed by Hawthorne James and starring Bryce Wilson, Mel Jackson, Tariq Alexander, and Hawthorne James.

Premise
Four friends from Harlem resort to con games and armed robbery in order to make ends meet, but they find their friendship put to the test when an influential slumlord plots to gentrify their neighborhood. Now, in order to prove that they can't be bought out or pushed around by a man who thinks everyone has their price, these four young hustlers are about to carry out their most ambitious and treacherous scam to date.

Cast
Bryce Wilson as Hands and a little man
Mel Jackson as Pennell
Tariq Alexander as Santos
Hawthorne James as Uncle Bo
Tara Magalski as Lisa

References

External links
 
DVD on sale at TSW Mall
The Stick Up Kids on Rotten Tomatoes

2008 films
Hood films
2008 crime drama films
American crime drama films
2000s English-language films
2000s American films